The C5a receptor also known as complement component 5a receptor 1 (C5AR1) or CD88 (Cluster of Differentiation 88) is a G protein-coupled receptor  for C5a. It functions as a complement receptor. C5a receptor modulates inflammatory responses, obesity, development and cancers.

Cells
The C5a receptor is expressed on:
Granulocytes
Monocytes
Dendritic cells
Hepatoma-derived cell line HepG2
Astrocytes
Microglia

Agonist and antagonists 
Potent and selective agonist and antagonists for C5aR have been developed.

See also 
Complement component 5a for binding mechanism

References

Further reading

External links